Krasnoye is a rural locality (a selo) in Tolshmenskoye Rural Settlement, Totemsky  District, Vologda Oblast, Russia. The population was 51 as of 2002. There are 3 streets.

Geography 
Krasnoye is located 66 km southwest of Totma (the district's administrative centre) by road. Cherepanikha is the nearest rural locality.

References 

Rural localities in Totemsky District